List of electric bus makers lists makers and models of battery-powered all-electric trucks.

Autocar trucks 

Autocar's E-ACTT is the fully-electric version of its leading ACTT terminal tractor model. Andrew Taitz, chairman of Autocar said, "The E-ACTT is the only original equipment manufacturer (OEM) terminal tractor with an OEM developed electric vehicle system, all Autocar".

Autocar announced two alpha units of the E-ACX low cabover model began field testing in August 2022.

BYD 

In China, BYD sold 7,969 all-electric/PHEV/hydrogen commercial vehicles in 2018, and 3,836 of them in 2019. These figures exclude buses.

The manufacturer sells light-, medium- and heavy-duty electric trucks. The heaviest of them is the 8TT, which is a Class 8 semi-tractor equipped with a 435 kWh battery. The Chinese manufacturer gained a foothold in the US market: its customers include Anheuser-Busch, which deployed 21 electric semi-tractors from BYD in California.

Terberg
The Dutch manufacturer, Terberg, has provided an electrically powered 40-ton truck for transporting material on public roads; it is reported to commute eight times a day between a logistics center and the Munich BMW plant. The truck battery takes three to four hours to charge. When fully charged, the vehicle has a range of up to 100 kilometres. Thus, the electric truck can theoretically complete a full production day without any additional recharging. Compared to a diesel engine truck, the electric truck will save 11.8 tons of CO2 annually.

Tesla 
Tesla Semi

Daimler AG

Mitsubishi Fuso 
Mitsubishi Fuso began deliveries of the eCanter in 2017.

Mercedes-Benz 
Mercedes-Benz began delivering eActros units to 10 customers in September 2018 for a two-year real-world test. Customers include Dachser, Edeka, Hermes, Kraftverkehr Nagel, Ludwig Meyer, Pfenning Logistics, TBS Rhein-Neckar and Rigterink of Deutschland, and Camion Transport and Migros of Switzerland.

Freightliner 
Freightliner began delivering e-M2 trucks to Penske in December 2018, and will commercialize its larger e-Cascadia in 2019. A total of 50 electric trucks should be on the road by the end of 2019, including 20 units delivered to Penske and NFI. The Portland factory will be renovated to start electric truck production in 2021.

Hyundai and Kia

In 2020, Hyundai sold over 9,000 units of its Porter Electric truck in South Korea while Kia sold over 5,000 units of the Kia Bongo EV in the same market.

Nikola Motors

The company makes the Nikola Tre BEV battery electric semi-truck, a Class 8 truck. The total battery capacity (9 packs) is 733 kWh, the connector type is CCS (CCS1 and CCS2) and charging time (80%) 160 minutes @ 175 kW. Charging up to 350 kW is expected to be available via update in Q4 2022.

Paccar

DAF 
DAF delivered its first CF semi-truck to Jumbo for testing in December 2018. It uses a VDL powertrain. The logistics company Tinie Manders Transport received a unit in February 2019, and Contargo in Germany received two units in May.

DAF supplies the CF Electric as a two-axle tractor unit (the FT ; GCW: 37 tonnes) that's ideally suited for emission-free, almost silent supermarket deliveries. The three-axle rigid truck (the FAN; GVW: up to 29 tonnes) has a steered trailing rear axle for maximum manoeuvrability and is the ideal base for a refuse collection vehicle or distribution truck.

Peterbilt 
Peterbilt unveiled in early 2018 a partnership with Meritor and TransPower, who will supply all-electric drivetrain systems for two Peterbilt vehicle platforms. They will produce twelve Class 8 579EV day cab tractors and three 520EV trash trucks that will be tested for about a year. In January 2019, Peterbilt unveiled its medium-duty 220EV also made in partnership with Meritor and TransPower. Six units should be delivered to its major customer in 2019. The manufacturer expects to have a total of more than 30 electric trucks on the road by the end of 2019.

Rivian 
Rivian made headlines in September 2020, when Amazon (one of its investors) announced its plans to purchase 100,000 of the automotive's all-electric delivery trucks. It was a huge, China-scale order, geared toward helping Amazon reach its 2040 net-zero carbon goal. It's in the final stages of testing its electric pickup truck, the R1T, which it plans to begin full-scale production on in 2020. According to Amazon, that's also when it will make its first delivery with a Rivian prototype.  The company expects to have 10,000 Rivian delivery vehicles on the road by 2022, and Rivian said that all 100,000 electric delivery trucks will be in service by 2023.

Smith Electric Vehicles

Newton
Launched in 2006, the Newton electric truck is an all-electric commercial vehicle from Smith Electric Vehicles. Each is available in short, medium or long wheelbase.

The truck was launched with a 120 kilowatt electric induction motor from Enova Systems, driven by Lithium-Ion Iron Phosphate batteries supplied by Valence Technology. In 2012 Smith re-released the Newton with new driveline and battery systems that were developed in-house. Smith offers the battery pack in either 80 kWh or 120 kWh configurations.

Newton was named Green Commercial of the Year in the electric vehicle section of Fleet Transport magazine's Irish Truck of the Year Awards 2010, sponsored by Castrol.

Tata 
Tata Ultra T.7 is India's first fully electric truck. The truck comes with mordern design and powertrain of zero emission.It is designed to bear a payload range of 3692–4935 kg.
It has a weight of 7490 kg and equipped with 6 wheels. Tata motors also launched an electric version of Tata Ace. It is a small commercial vehicle which is designed to be used in cities The Ace EV is the first product featuring Tata Motors' EVOGEN powertrain. It is powered by a 27 kW (36 hp) motor with 130 N m of peak torque, cargo volume of 208 ft^3 and grade-ability of 22%.

Volkswagen AG

MAN 
MAN began delivering a dozen units of various e-TGM trucks (articulated, refrigerated, flatbed...) in September 2018 for testing purposes with different customers. A small series production will take place before a larger serial production scheduled to begin in 2022.

In 2022, IAA Transportation launched the near-production Man eTruck, which will go into series production in 2024. It is a long-haul truck. daily ranges of between 600 and 800 kilometers are already possible in just a few years, and in perspective, even up to 1,000 kilometers should be possible. It is prepared for the upcoming DC megawatt charging standard, so drivers can recharge their eTrucks at high power during the obligatory 45-minute rest period.

Volvo AB

Mack 
Mack unveiled the LR refuse truck in May 2019. Its commercialization should begin in 2019. New York City Department of Sanitation will test one unit beginning in 2020.

Renault Trucks 

Renault Trucks, part of Volvo, began selling an electric version of its Maxity small truck in 2010. Renault Trucks was the first to build heavy-duty trucks, with three prototypes of electric Renault Midlum and a later Renault D tested in real conditions by different customers (Carrefour, Nestlé, Guerlain) for a few years between 2012 and 2016. A prototype D truck was delivered to Delanchy in November 2017.

After testing is completed, Renault will commercialize its D and D Wide trucks in 2019. They will be built in France alongside their Volvo counterparts.

Renault Trucks has unveiled the models of its heavy-duty all-electric range in November 2022. The Renault Trucks E-Tech T and C, which are for regional distribution and construction, will be produced in series at the Bourg-en-Bresse factory from 2023.

Volvo 
Volvo planned to launch their first mass-produced electric FE and FL trucks in early 2021, to be built in France alongside their Renault counterparts. An electric VNR semi-trailer truck was delivered to North American customers for testing in 2021. An updated VNR Electric is scheduled to begin production in 2022, in Dublin, Virginia.

Models from smaller manufacturers

Alkè 
Some of the electric cars made by Alkè (for example the Alkè ATX 100 E) are used in soccer stadiums as open ambulances. The operator of London's cycle hire scheme uses a small number of Alkè electric utility vehicles (alongside other cars and vans) to tow trailers for distributing bicycles.

CityFreighter
CF1 is a full electric, designed for urban deliveries, with low floor, 86 kWh Lithium Ion Battery, reach . In Europe is a Class N2, 4,25 tons GVWR, payload 1,85 tons,load volume 20 m3; and in USA is a 
Class 3, 4,8 tons GVWR, payload 2.4 tons,load volume 706 ft3.

E-Force One 

In January 2014, COOP Switzerland began operating an 18 ton (16 metric ton) electric truck with a replaceable battery. 18 square meters of photovoltaic elements are positioned on its roof. The truck's battery has a capacity of 300 kWh. The solar panels along with regenrative braking provide 23 percent of the total energy. The range is 240 km per day. Energy consumption is 130 kWh per 100 km. Net of the solar/regenerative energy it consumes about 100 kWh per 100 km, about  the energy needed by a comparable diesel engine. The truck weighs eight tons, with a gross vehicle weight of 18 tonnes and costs 380,000 Swiss francs. It is about twice as expensive as the diesel version. The truck is based on an Iveco Stralis chassis. The truck's operating price is 10 francs per 100 kilometres, much less than the diesel version at 50 francs per 100 kilometres. The truck has two LiFePO4 batteries with a capacity of 120 kWh with a weight of 1300 kg. The battery can be replaced within 10 minutes. Maintenance and the service life are not higher than a comparable diesel truck.

The truck won the 2014 German Federal Ecodesign and the 2014 Euro Solar European Solar Prize in the category transport and mobility.

Two trucks began operating in mid-2014 at Lidl in Switzerland and one at Feldschlösschen Beverages Ltd. In June 2015, Pistor began operating one. Shipping company Meyer Logistics uses refrigerated models in Berlin.

eHighway 
In 2018, Siemens and the South Coast Air Quality Management District launched an electrified highway demonstration project near the Los Angeles Port and Long Beach Port, using overhead lines to supply the trucks with electrical power instead of relying on onboard batteries.

GGT Electric 
In 2011, GGT Electric, an automotive engineering, design and manufacturing company based in Milford, Michigan, introduced a new line of all-electric trucks for sale. GGT has developed LSV zero-emission electric vehicles for fleet markets, municipalities, universities, and state and federal government. The company offers 4-door electric pick-up trucks, electric passenger vans, and flatbed electric trucks with tilt and dump capability.

Haul truck
The company Lithium Storage GmbH is building together with the company Kuhn Switzerland AG a battery-powered haul truck. The vehicle is to go the end of 2016 in operation. The dump truck weighs 110 tons. The chassis is a Komatsu 605-7. The vehicles have an electric motor with 800 hp and can thus produce 5900 Nm. The battery is a 600 kWh lithium-ion battery. For comparison, diesel vehicles of this type consume approximately 50,000 to 100,000 liters of diesel per year.

Motiv Power Systems
Founded in 2009, Motiv Power Systems began as a power train manufacturer and launched its electric powertrain control system (ePCS) which could be scaled to power any type of truck, from shuttle buses and Class-A school buses, to work trucks, box trucks, and  garbage trucks. Motiv pivoted to provide electrified chassis based on the Ford platform including the E450 and the F59. These electrified chassis were deployed in a variety of vehicles including Type A school buses, shuttle buses, Type C school buses, box trucks, and walk-in delivery cans. While the ePCS could be used with almost any new truck maker's chassis or for an older truck retrofit, the level of engineering integration meant the vehicles manufactured at scale were fully developed chassis. Beginning in 2015 Motiv's delivery trucks have been in service with AmeriPride  in linen delivery applications. Motiv electrified chassis were certified by the California Air Resources Board, enabling them to be sold through California state programs including HVIP. Motiv collaborates with existing truck body manufacturers to allow them to sell electric options using the electrified chassis as a drop in replacement on their existing manufacturing lines. An example of this type of manufacturing can be seen in the development of delivery vans with both Morgon Olson  and Utilimaster.

Newton
Launched in 2006, the Newton electric truck is an all-electric commercial vehicle from Smith Electric Vehicles. Each is available in short, medium or long wheelbase.

The truck was launched with a 120 kilowatt electric induction motor from Enova Systems, driven by Lithium-Ion Iron Phosphate batteries supplied by Valence Technology. In 2012 Smith re-released the Newton with new driveline and battery systems that were developed in-house. Smith offers the battery pack in either 80 kWh or 120 kWh configurations.

Newton was named Green Commercial of the Year in the electric vehicle section of Fleet Transport magazine's Irish Truck of the Year Awards 2010, sponsored by Castrol.

Orange EV 
Riverside, Missouri-based Orange EV began producing Class-8 all-electric terminal trucks for industrial use in 2012. It operates in 30 states in America and is the only manufacturer in the country with the most zero emission trucks in operation. The company uses a turnkey approach that enables its clients to get end-to-end support. In June 2022, the 3rd generation 4x2 e-TRIEVER truck was announced.

Its trucks have a gross vehicle weight rating of 81,000 lb, a max speed of 25 mph, maximum lift height of 62 inches, and battery capacity up to 180 kWh.

PapaBravo Innovations 
In 2011, PapaBravo Innovations, an electric vehicle design, manufacturing and engineering company based in Saskatoon, Saskatchewan, Canada introduced a full line of heavy-duty underground mining trucks. These off-road 4x4 trucks are the first of their kind; a one-ton platform with full-time 4-wheel-drive capability. They have been designed specifically for "soft-rock" underground mining industries. The line of electric trucks ranges from 1/4-ton utility vehicles to 1-ton trucks and a 12-passenger personnel transport vehicle.

Quantron
Quantron AG is founded in 2019 and offers:

Q-Light: from 3.49 to 7.2 metric tons (7,694 to 16,500 lb): our Q-Light range includes electric vehicles for passenger transportation and inner-city deliveries – such as electric passenger vans, cargo vans, panel vans and flatbed vans. 
Q-Heavy: gross combined weight of 18 to 44 metric tons (40,000 to 97,000 lb): our heavy e-trucks are used as electrically powered truck-trailers, semi-trailers, dump semi-trailers or concrete mixers – maximum efficiency and low noise with no emissions.
Q-Retrofit: its QUANTRON INSIDE division, thereby giving them a second, environmentally friendly life (Second Life) – huge potential for climate protection and resource management. The emissions from battery production can be offset by the CO2 emissions saved from not manufacturing a new vehicle every time

Quantron supplies IKEA Vienna with fleet of e-utility vehicles.

Tevva 

In September 2021, Tevva unveiled its Tevva Truck – the first British designed 7.5-tonne electric truck intended for mass production in the UK. The truck has a range of up to 160 miles (250 km) in pure battery electric vehicle (BEV) form or up to 310 miles (500 km) with its patented range extender technology (REX). The Tevva Truck can carry up to 16 euro pallets and over two tonnes payload at 7.5-tonnes Gross Vehicle Weight (GVW). The total cost of ownership is comparable to a diesel; parity is achieved at approximately 3,000 km or when 500 litres of diesel is consumed per month.

Volta 
The company has developed a truck that gives the driver a 220-degree view, similar to what one might see on a city bus. The driver's seat is in the centre of the cab. On the inside of the 16-ton truck, called Volta Zero, sits a single unit containing an electric motor, transmission and rear axle supplied by OEM supplier Meritor. The truck has a range of between 150–200 km per charge.

Workhorse
It is developing the Workhorse W-15, a plug-in electric pickup truck.

Xos
Xos, Inc. is publicly listed truck OEM based in Los Angeles, California which produces three models of electric trucks: The class 8 HDXT; and the class 7 MDXT; the class 5/6 SV05 stepvan. The company provided guidance it would deliver approximately 300 units during 2022, 217 of which had already been delivered through the third quarter.

See also 
 List of electric bus makers
 Electric van
 Electric vehicle conversion

References

Makers and models
Electrical-engineering-related lists
Truck-related lists
Lists of manufacturers